Gerber Peak is a peak  south-southwest of Rahir Point, standing close south of Thomson Cove, Flandres Bay, on the west coast of Graham Land, Antarctica. It was charted by the Belgian Antarctic Expedition under Gerlache, 1897–99. It was named by the UK Antarctic Place-Names Committee in 1960 for Friedrich Gerber (1797–1872), a Swiss veterinary surgeon who first suggested the use of photography for book illustration, in 1839.

References

Mountains of Graham Land
Danco Coast